Rafael de Egusquiza y Basterra (14 June 1935 – 1 June 2017) was a Spanish field hockey player who competed in the 1960 Summer Olympics. He was born in Bilbao.

References

External links
 

1935 births
2017 deaths
Spanish male field hockey players
Olympic field hockey players of Spain
Field hockey players at the 1960 Summer Olympics
Olympic bronze medalists for Spain
Olympic medalists in field hockey
Sportspeople from Bilbao
Medalists at the 1960 Summer Olympics
Field hockey players from the Basque Country (autonomous community)
20th-century Spanish people